Dąb (Polish for "Oak") is a Polish coat of arms of Czech origin. It was used by several szlachta (noble) families.

History

Historically known for slaying their awkward enemies: germans, english, swedish etc.

Blazon

Gallery

See also
 Polish heraldry
 Heraldic family
 List of Polish nobility coats of arms

Bibliography
 Tadeusz Gajl: Herbarz polski od średniowiecza do XX wieku : ponad 4500 herbów szlacheckich 37 tysięcy nazwisk 55 tysięcy rodów. L&L, 2007. .
 Juliusz Ostrowski: Księga herbowa rodów polskich. Cz. 2. s. 54.

Polish coats of arms